Kori Kelley-Seehafer (born April 30, 1975) is a road cyclist from United States. She represented her nation at the 2005 and 2008 UCI Road World Championships.

References

External links
 
 

1975 births
Living people
American female cyclists
Place of birth missing (living people)
21st-century American women